"Ladbroke Grove" is a song by British rapper AJ Tracey, written by AJ Tracey and Conducta and produced by Conducta. It was released on 4 June 2019 as the fifth single from AJ Tracey's self-titled debut album. The song contains a sample of "Wandering Romance", written by Jorja Smith, Michael Stafford and Felix Joseph, and performed by Jorja Smith. The song is based in the area of the same name in west London.

Initially debuting at number 48 on the UK Singles Chart in February 2019, the song eventually peaked at number three in October 2019 following its release as a single. In May 2020, the British Phonographic Industry certified the song as double Platinum for sales of 1,200,000 equivalent units. In June 2022 it was certified triple Platinum.

In September 2019, NME included the remix of "Ladbroke Grove" in their "25 essential UK garage anthems" list.

Track listing

Charts

Weekly charts

Year-end charts

Certifications

References

2019 singles
2019 songs
AJ Tracey songs
Ladbroke Grove
Songs written by AJ Tracey
UK garage songs